Conquest (also called Marie Walewska) is a 1937 Metro-Goldwyn-Mayer film which tells the story of the Polish Countess Marie Walewska, who becomes the mistress of Napoleon in order to influence his actions towards her homeland. It stars Greta Garbo, Charles Boyer, Reginald Owen, Alan Marshal, Henry Stephenson, Leif Erickson, Dame May Whitty, George Zucco, and Maria Ouspenskaya.

The movie was adapted by S.N. Behrman, Samuel Hoffenstein, Helen Jerome and Salka Viertel from the novel Pani Walewska by Wacław Gąsiorowski. It was directed by Clarence Brown and Gustav Machatý (uncredited).

It was nominated for Best Actor in a Leading Role (Charles Boyer) and Best Art Direction (Cedric Gibbons and William A. Horning).

Its worldwide gross amounted to $2,141,000. But its massive budget led to a loss of $1,397,000.

MGM initially advertised the upcoming release of the film under the title "Marie Walewska", but at the last moment changed it to the more marketable "Conquest" when it arrived in theaters.

The Dad's Army episode "A Soldier's Farewell" starts with the platoon in the cinema watching this film.

Plot
Napoleon Bonaparte (Charles Boyer) launches an unsuccessful seduction of the Countess Marie Walewska (Greta Garbo), who is married to a much older man (Henry Stephenson), but she resists until convinced that giving in will save Poland. After her husband annuls their marriage and Napoleon divorces the Empress Josephine, the pair are free to formalize their happy relationship, but Napoleon shocks her by announcing his decision to wed the Archduchess Marie Louise of Austria for political reasons. While he doesn't expect it to impact his relationship with Marie, she leaves him, without ever telling him that she is expecting his child.

Cast

 Greta Garbo as Countess Marie Walewska
 Charles Boyer as Emperor Napoleon Bonaparte
 Reginald Owen as Talleyrand
 Alan Marshal as Captain d'Ornano
 Henry Stephenson as Count Anastas Walewski
 Leif Erickson as Paul Lachinski (as Leif Erikson)
 Dame May Whitty as Maria Letizia Buonaparte
 Maria Ouspenskaya as Countess Pelagia Walewska
 C. Henry Gordon as Prince Poniatowski
 Claude Gillingwater as Stephan (Marie's servant)
 Vladimir Sokoloff as Dying soldier
 George F. Houston as Géraud Duroc

Uncredited Cast

 Stanley Andrews as Prince Mirska
 Oscar Apfel as Count Potocka
 Scotty Beckett as Alexandre Walewska
 Betty Blythe as Princess Mirska
 Ed Brady as Soldier
 George Cowl as Count Augustus Walewska 
 Paul Fix as Dumb Soldier
 Henry Kolker as Sen. Wybitcki
 Mitchell Lewis as Beppo
 Lois Meredith as Countess Potocka
 Charles Middleton as Sergeant at Elba
 Dennis O'Keefe as Jan Walewska
 Robert Warwick as Capt. Laroux
 Ian Wolfe as Prince Metternich
 Noble Johnson as Roustam Raza
 George Givot as Constant

Production
Boyer's fee was $125,000, with an equal amount to be paid for any French version, as well as an overtime provision. In the final event, Boyer earned $450,000 for his performance; reshoots on the film saw the budget rise.

Reception
Writing for Night and Day in 1937, Graham Greene gave the film a poor review, characterizing it simply as "one of the dullest films of the year". Greene's chief complaints came from the plot, writing, and "middlebrow" dialogue which inelegantly attempted to bridge "poetic and realistic drama". Greene also notes a number of scenes or moments of "unconscious comedy" which undermined the film and let to a feeling of "great fake emotions booming out - Love, Country, Ambition". On Rotten Tomatoes, the film has an aggregate score of 100% based on 5 critic reviews.

The film grossed $730,000 in the United States and $1,411,000 abroad, bringing the total sum of $2,141,000. Although a hit it lost $1,397,000, due to such a high budget.

References

External links
 
 
 
 

1937 films
1937 romantic drama films
American romantic drama films
Films about Napoleon
American black-and-white films
Films based on Polish novels
Films based on romance novels
American films based on plays
Films directed by Clarence Brown
Films directed by Gustav Machatý 
Films scored by Herbert Stothart
Metro-Goldwyn-Mayer films
Films based on multiple works
History of Poland on film
Cultural depictions of Charles Maurice de Talleyrand-Périgord
1930s American films